Frederick William Haddon (8 February 1839 – 7 March 1906), was an English-born Australian journalist and newspaper editor.

Biography
Haddon was born at Croydon, England, the son of Richard Haddon, a schoolmaster and landscape artist, and his wife Mary Caroline, née Wykes. Haddon was educated at private schools and in 1859 became assistant-secretary of the Statistical Society of London and of the Institute of Actuaries. Haddon resigned these positions in 1863 to accept an engagement with The Argus, Melbourne. 

Haddon arrived in Melbourne in December 1863 was soon made sub-editor. When the new weekly The Australasian was established in 1864, Haddon became its first editor, and in January 1867 was made editor of The Argus at 27 years of age. It was a period of great developments in Victoria, and under Haddon's editorship the Argus, while distinctly conservative served a most useful purpose in advocating the claims of the primary producers, and endeavouring to keep protective duties within reasonable bounds. It fought with success for non-political control of government departments and purity of administration, with the result that Victoria set a high standard among the colonies in these matters.  Richard Twopeny, described The Argus as 'the best daily paper published out of England'. When Graham Berry and Charles Henry Pearson went as an embassy to the Parliament of the United Kingdom in 1879, Haddon, who was visiting England in that year, was asked by some of their opponents to set the facts of the controversy before the "government, parliament and press of Great Britain". He compiled a pamphlet which was printed in London, The Constitutional Difficulty in Victoria. This was sent to all the members of the British parliament and to the press. Haddon also personally interviewed leading statesmen and editors, and probably was a strong influence on the non-success of the mission. There was not really, however, a strong case for British interference.

On his return from Britain, Haddon went back to his editorial chair. He was of a dispassionate nature and set a high standard in the discussion of public matters. The Argus fought well for federation, which had practically become certain when Haddon in 1898 resigned his editorship to take up the important task of representing the Edward Wilson Estate on the management of the Argus and Australasian. Haddon was Melbourne correspondent for The Times in 1895–1903, and was president of the Victorian Poultry and Kennel Club. Haddon died at Melbourne on 7 March 1906. Haddon was married twice: firstly to Annie Jane King (died 1875) and secondly to Alice Annie Good on 31 January 1883 who survived him with a daughter by the first marriage. 

Haddon appreciated good writing and was always ready to encourage it. As an editor, he refused to be affected by popular excitement, and though his paper was on occasions criticized for not taking a stronger stand, he probably did all that could be done when it is remembered how strong the remarkable personality of David Syme had made The Age, which for a great part of the period was issued at a lower price than the Argus, and had a much larger circulation.

References
Carole Woods, 'Haddon, Frederick William (1839–1906)', Australian Dictionary of Biography, Volume 4, MUP, 1972, pp 313–314. Retrieved on 1 January 2009

1839 births
1906 deaths
19th-century Australian journalists
Australian newspaper editors
The Argus (Melbourne) people
People from Croydon
English emigrants to colonial Australia